Iván Germán Velázquez Durán (23 April 1979) is an expert in intelligence, counterintelligence, counterterrorism, psychological operations, electronic warfare and propaganda, and former Argentine military officer and former Director of Counterintelligence of Argentina Airport Security Police (PSA) currently residing in exile in the Republic of Uruguay after fleeing his country and seek political asylum after being accused in Argentina by the government of Cristina Fernández de Kirchner of having been responsible for the operation of electronic espionage largest in the history of the continent in an affair known as the "South American Watergate" in which he was charged with having spied electronically intercepted emails and wireless communications of all Argentina's political class that included also businessmen, journalists and relevant public personalities, reaching even to the president of that country itself.

The case that shook South America involves the prosecution of Argentina to the former military officer Iván Velázquez for having ridden a para-state Secret Service and conspiring politically to overthrow the government of Argentina through supporting the protests of peasant sectors against the Argentine government of President Cristina Fernández de Kirchner, as well as having tried to overthrow the defence minister of that country, Nilda Garré in order to put in his place to the then Interior Minister Aníbal Fernández.

Velázquez, who remains in Uruguay after this country refused to the extradition requested by Argentina, after being in prison for nearly a year pending the determination of their resolution, which has been finally determined it as a purely political offense (Reason for no extradition between the two countries under a treaty of 1800) and after that the intelligence service of Uruguayan police had detected and aborted an operation mounted by Argentine agents to assassinate former Argentina's intelligence hierarch, was also accused of having spied several governments in South America and of involvement in arms trafficking operations to African countries.

He is currently director of the firm ICG GROUP (Counsulting Intelligence Group), a private firm with subsidiaries in several countries in South America and Africa.

While the accusations by the Argentine government could not be substantiated, since Velázquez by refusing to be extradited to his country and the constitution does not allow for the trial in absentia, there is some suspicion that the charges against the former military and spy would motivated by refusing to carry out domestic spying (Prohibited by the constitution of this country) at the request of the presidents Néstor Kirchner and Cristina Fernández, which would become the persecution by the presidential marriage to the former spy chief who also have been responsible for the creation of a mega spy intel system known as "Vampire Project" whose aim would have the same objective as the American ECHELON.

Among those involved in this alleged coup failed, are former Head of State Intelligence Secretariat (SIDE), Juan Bautista Yofre, Major General Daniel Reimundes, Deputy Director of Counterintelligence of the PSA, Pablo Alfredo Carpenter and fifty persons among them are journalists, soldiers, policemen and businessmen in the "mega-Espionage" affair which has strongly questioned by the Judge Sandra Arroyo Salgado, wife of the Prosecutor Alberto Nisman also questioned for his lack of results in the investigation of terrorist attacks against the AMIA Jewish Mutual of Argentina and its relationship with a sector of the intelligence services of the country linked to drug trafficking by the Director of Operations of the Secret Service presidential Antonio Horacio Stiuso, who part of the Argentine press and the accused themselves of responsibility for the conspiracy have mounted a legal case without evidence.

References

External links
 In March 2008 the Argentine newspaper entitled Profile: Official Profile | SIDE repentant, "exiles" in Montevideo 
 On 12 March 2009 the BBC entitled "Southern Cone behind Argentine spy":
 The Vampire Project: 
 On September 17 the Argentine newspaper URGENT 24 titles "Ladies and gentlemen, this is a scandal: The Side (Stiusso / Pocino) and Página/12 vs. Aníbal Fernández" 
 On September 20 URGENT Argentinean newspaper 24 published in relation to the conspiracy as part of the Argentina press attributed to a plot against Velázquez, an exchange of emails between the chief of presidential intelligence operations, and Judge Stiuso Arroyo Salgado New spy scandal Velázquez against Stiusso spy chief (and the judge Arroyo): When falls the cause?: 
 The site of La Patria Grande alternative journalism published in relation to an investigation by journalist Christian Sanz "Drugs in Ezeiza and nerves Kirchner": 
 In relation to the attempted coup. The information portal Refer ONE MINUTE: 
 In March 2008 the daily Página/12 references on Velázquez and a group of soldiers among them were former military intelligence chief, Brigadier General Osvaldo Montero and the National Criminal Intelligence Director, Verónica Fernández Zagari those responsible for "concoct various conspiracies" between the vessels which are the subvlevación peasants against the government: 
 In July 2008 the Argentine daily La Nacion under "Investigate a spy for political purposes" refers to the attempted overthrow by Velázquez of Defense Minister Nilda Garre, in a plot of several soldiers who were members for put in its place the then Interior Minister Dr. Aníbal Fernández:  

1979 births
Living people
Argentine police officers